Gnaphalium sylvaticum, commonly known as heath cudweed, wood cudweed, golden motherwort, chafeweed, and owl's crown, is a species of plant in the family Asteraceae. It is widespread across much of Europe. The species was first formally described by Carl Linnaeus in 1753.

Description
It is a perennial herb with short runners.

The plant is 8 to 60 cm tall.

The leaves are lanceolate in shape, pointed, 2 to 8 cm long, with a single vein.  They have no hair on top, but are woolly hairy below.  The upper leaves become progressively shorter and narrower.

The flower heads are 6mm long.  The bracts of the flower heads have a green centre, and chaffy brown edges.  The florets are pale brown.  The achenes are hairy with reddish pappus hairs.

It flowers from July until September.

References

External links

Online Atlas of the British and Irish flora, Gnaphalium sylvaticum (Heath Cudweed)
Gnaphalium sylvaticum - (Omalotheca sylvatica) Botanik im Bild  /  Flora von Österreich    

sylvaticum
Plants described in 1753
Taxa named by Carl Linnaeus
Flora of Europe